Samuel Ishimwe Karemangingo (born 1991), is a Rwandan filmmaker. He is best known as the director of critically acclaim short film Imfura, where he became the first Rwandan filmmaker represented at Berlinale. Apart from being a director, he is also a cinematographer, editor, sound engineer, screenwriter and producer.

Personal life
He was born in 1991 in Kigali, Rwanda. Her mother left him when he was a baby and lost his parents and family member during Rwandan genocide.

Career
After completing secondary studies in 2010, Ishimwe started working as a reporter and Photographer at the 'igihe.com'. In 2011, he made the maiden short film Paying debts which was screened in the Rwanda Film Festival. In the same year, he participated documentary workshop in Uganda conducted by Maisha Film Lab. While at Uganda, he worked as an assistant producer on short documentary Invisible souls. Later in 2011, he participated in a documentary film directing workshop called 'K-dox' conducted by James Longley. In June 2012, Ishimwe finished a 3 months intensive course on filmmaking at Kwetu Film Institute. Then in September 2012, he participated in writing and directing program called 'A Sample of Work'.

He wrote the script of Crossing Lines and won an award in a local scriptwriting competition organised by Goethe Institut Rwanda. Later he worked as a journalist and photographer after graduating from National University of Rwanda. Then he went Switzerland for further studies. In June 2017, Ishimwe obtained a film degree at the Haute école d’art et de design (Geneva School of Art and Design–HEAD).

In 2017, he made the short Imfura, which means 'First Born'. The film deals with a story set in a post-genocide Rwanda. It is the first Rwandan production to be included in the competition of Berlinale Shorts. The short won the Silver Bear Jury Price at Berlin International Film Festival.

Filmography

References

External links
 

Living people
1991 births
Rwandan film directors
People from Kigali